Abad may refer to:

Places
 -abad, a suffix used in place names in Iran, Pakistan, Afghanistan, and India
Abad, Azerbaijan, a village
Abad, Bushehr, Iran
Abad, Hormozgan, Iran
Abad-e Eram Posht, Isfahan Province, Iran
Abad-e Soleyman, Isfahan Province, Iran
Abad, Kerman, Iran
Abad, Khuzestan, Iran
Abad, Kandiaro Taluka, Sindh, Pakistan

People
Abad (surname)

See also
ABAD (disambiguation)